The 1999 Castle Point Borough Council election took place on 6 May 1999 to elect members of Castle Point Borough Council in Essex, England. The whole council was up for election and the Labour party stayed in overall control of the council.

Background
Before the election Labour controlled the council with 32 councillors, compared to 5 for the Conservatives and 2 seats were vacant. This came after Labour had won a majority at the 1995 election gaining 30 seats from the Conservatives and meant the Conservatives required a swing of over 10% to take back control.

Both the Conservative and Labour parties contested every ward, while the Green party had 3 candidates. Meanwhile, the Liberal Democrats did not stand any candidates at the election, despite having put up over a dozen candidates in 1995.

Election result
The Labour held onto control of the council with 24 councillors, but lost 10 seats to the Conservatives who finished with 15 seats. Most of the Conservative advances came in Benfleet, where they picked up 6 seats. Meanwhile, the Conservatives gained both seats in Canvey South after 2 recounts, with the final result in that ward being announced the day after the election. Overall turnout at the election was 32%.

Ward results

By-elections between 1999 and 2003

References

Castle Point Borough Council elections
1999 English local elections
1990s in Essex